Operation Greenhouse was the fifth American nuclear test series, the second conducted in 1951 and the first to test principles that would lead to developing thermonuclear weapons (hydrogen bombs). Conducted at the new Pacific Proving Ground, on islands of the Enewetak Atoll, it mounted the devices on large steel towers to simulate air bursts. This series of nuclear weapons tests was preceded by Operation Ranger and succeeded by Operation Buster-Jangle.

Operation Greenhouse showcased new and aggressive designs for nuclear weapons. The main idea was to reduce the size, weight, and most importantly, reduce the amount of fissile material necessary for nuclear weapons, while increasing the destructive power. With the Soviet Union's first nuclear test a year and half earlier, the United States had begun stockpiling the new designs before they were actually proven. Thus the success of Operation Greenhouse was vital before the development of thermonuclear weapons could continue.

A number of target buildings, including bunkers, houses and factories were built on Mujinkarikku Islet to test nuclear weapon effects.

George

The George explosion conducted on May 8, 1951 was the world's first thermonuclear burn, though it was just a test design, unsuitable for weaponization. Shaped like a torus, the George device had a small amount of heavy isotopes of liquid hydrogen (deuterium and tritium) placed at its center. The vast majority of its yield derived from fission. The energy output from the thermonuclear fusion in this test was insignificant in comparison. The "George" device was more like a "boosted" nuclear bomb than a thermonuclear one. The small amount of heavy  deuterium and tritium in this test fused, but its role was to generate a strong flurry of fast neutrons - ones that sparked more fissions in the uranium nuclei that were present, and which also caused fission in uranium-238 - which does not fission under bombardment with slow neutrons, as does uranium-235.

The George design was a 'Classical Super' prototype with a binary triggering device using radiation implosion upon a cylinder. The design of the triggering system in this test was based on the one patented by Klaus Fuchs and von Neumann in 1946. Its success played a vital role in the history of the Teller–Ulam design.
The George Test had a perfect “bell” Wilson cloud formed near the top of the mushroom cloud.

The George test validated the principles which would be used for the first full-scale thermonuclear bomb test, Ivy Mike, one year later, on November 1, 1952, at Enewetak Atoll.

Item
Conducted on May 25, 1951, Item was the first test of an actual boosted fission weapon, nearly doubling the normal yield of a similar non-boosted weapon. In this test, deuterium-tritium (D-T) gas was injected into the enriched uranium core of a nuclear fission bomb. The extreme heat of the fissioning bomb produced thermonuclear fusion reactions within the D-T gas. While not enough to be considered a full nuclear fusion bomb, the large number of high-energy neutrons released nearly doubled the efficiency of the nuclear fission reaction.

Dog photograph
The Dog explosion is more popularly known for an image taken of those viewing it than the actual explosion itself; the photograph depicts numerous VIPs wearing safety goggles sitting on Adirondack chairs while being illuminated by the flash of the detonation. This photograph takes up the bottom portion of the cover of the 1995 documentary Trinity and Beyond by Peter Kuran. The safety goggles worn by all those viewing the test in the picture have become somewhat of a museum collectors item, with a possibility that Norman F. Ramsey may have been present. Cynthia Miller claims that her father, Van Dine, is the first man on the left in the photo. The blast wave safely arrived at the location of the VIPs some 45 seconds after the initially silent flash of the detonation as observed from their position on Parry island.

Gallery

List

See also 

 Trinity and Beyond
 Nuclear Test Film: Operation Greenhouse (1951)

References

External links 
 
 

Explosions in 1951
Greenhouse
1951 in military history
1950s in the Marshall Islands
1951 in the Trust Territory of the Pacific Islands
1951 in the environment
1951 in science
April 1951 events in Oceania
May 1951 events in Oceania
Articles containing video clips